The Nha Trang Stadium, or officially 19 August Stadium (Sân vận động 19 tháng 8), is a multi-use stadium in Nha Trang, Vietnam.  It is currently used mostly for football matches and are the home stadium of Khanh Hoa FC and 2016 Asian Beach Games.  The stadium holds 25,000 people.

References

Nha Trang
Football venues in Vietnam
Buildings and structures in Khánh Hòa province